Burnt Offerings is the seventh in the Anita Blake: Vampire Hunter series of horror/mystery/erotica novels by Laurell K. Hamilton.

Plot introduction

Burnt Offerings continues the adventures of Anita Blake, as she attempts to solve a series of arsons and other crimes, and deal with a threat to her lover, the vampire Jean-Claude, as he fends off a political challenge from the Vampire Council.  As with the other later novels in the series, Burnt Offerings blends elements of supernatural, police procedural, and erotic fiction.

Explanation of the title
As with previous novels, "Burnt Offerings" refers to a location within the novel itself.  In this case, "Burnt Offerings" is a vampire-themed theme restaurant where some of the events of the novel take place.  (The fictional restaurant is itself named after the real-world 1976 haunted house movie, Burnt Offerings.)

Plot summary

As in the previous novels, Burnt Offerings requires Anita to balance her romantic life with her roles as supernatural police consultant, vampire executioner, zombie animator, human servant and lover to the vampire Master of the City and lupa to the local werewolf pack.  In this case, Anita is quickly confronted with several problems that ultimately prove to be interrelated:
 Fire Captain Pete McKinnon wants Anita's help with a series of arson incidents that he believes to be the work of a pyrokinetic.
 The local wereleopard pard needs leadership and protection after Anita killed its "alpha," Gabriel in the previous novel, The Killing Dance.
 The Thronos Rokke pack of werewolves needs clear succession and protection, particularly while Richard is out of town studying for his master's degree.
 A vampire has been set on fire at the vampire owned and themed restaurant, "Burnt Offerings."  The woman who did so claims that the vampire tried to bite her against her will, and alleges self-defense.  This attack later proves to be the first in a series of attacks on vampires and vampire businesses.
 Most threatening, the Vampire Council has sent representatives to Jean-Claude's territory in an attempt to investigate and possibly destroy Jean-Claude.  The Council is threatened by Jean-Claude's ability to destroy one of its most powerful members, The Earthmover, and by Jean-Claude's refusal to take The Earthmover's place on the Council himself.  (Jean-Claude will not do so because he is not strong enough to hold the position against challengers; but the Council, based in Europe, fears that Jean-Claude is setting up a rival council in the United States).  The Council has sent representatives of four of its six remaining members, as follows:
 Council member The Traveler has arrived personally, or at least in spirit (one of his powers is the ability to possess other vampires, and the location of his actual body is never revealed).  The Traveler is accompanied by Balthasar, his human servant, and has also recruited one of Jean-Claude's vampires, Liv, to leave Jean-Claude's service and swear fealty to the Traveler.
 Council member the Master of Beasts has arrived personally, accompanied by his son, Fernando and the other members of his triumvirate, Gideon and Captain Thomas Carswell.
 Belle Morte does not come personally, but is represented by Asher, Jean-Claude's former lover and current mortal enemy.
 Morte d'Amour is represented by the vampires Yvette and Warrick.

Anita is forced to put the mysteries aside as she participates in a series of confrontations between Jean-Claude's followers and the council.  Ultimately, Anita's combination of loyalty, ruthlessness, and naiveté allows her to triumph over each of the delegations of vampires.

 The Master of Beasts and Fernando attempt to seize control of as many of the city's lycanthropes as possible, but are ultimately stopped by Anita, Richard and Rafael.  Anita assumes control of the leopard pard and fully assumes her role as lupa, rescuing all of the local shapeshifters with Richard and Jean-Claude's help, but not before the Master of Beasts, Fernando, and Liv torture Rafael and Fernando and Liv torture and rape Sylvie and Vivian.
 Anita shares Jean-Claude's love for Asher, notwithstanding Asher's scars and his hatred of them both.  Ultimately, their love wins Asher over, and he decides to leave Belle Morte's service and remain in St. Louis with Anita and Jean-Claude.
 Anita offers friendship to the Traveler, and challenges him to be a worthy ruler when she discovers that his power is causing local vampires to become feral.  Intrigued, he accepts.
 As she and Richard confront the Master of Beasts a second time, the Master lets Anita get too close.  Anita draws on the power of Raina's munin, using Raina's powers to threaten harm rather than healing.  With the Master's heart in her metaphysical grip, Anita threatens to kill him unless the Master leaves St. Louis and turns over Liv and Fernando to suffer the punishment for raping a member of Anita's werewolf pack.  The Master is loath to give up his son, but ultimately agrees, and Anita turns Liv and Fernando over to Sylvie and the pack, winning their loyalty as their lupa.
 Yvette then reveals her plan, solving the remaining mysteries.  Like Mister Oliver before him, Yvette's master, Morte d'Amour, fears the US experiment with vampire legalization and wishes to sabotage it.  Yvette, together with Harry, the owner of Burnt Offerings, has been provoking Humans First to attack vampires and vampire businesses, and plans for Asher to kill Jean-Claude, seize control of the city's vampires, and provoke them into a murderous rampage.  Asher, won over by Jean-Claude and Anita, refuses.  Yvette then reveals her back-up plan—at her instructions, Warrick, a pyrokinetic, has been setting the arson fires, and will burn down a stadium full of people.  Warrick, a former crusader, announces that he has rediscovered his faith in God and refuses to assist Yvette.  Yvette then announces that she personally will go on a rampage, but is stopped by Warrick, who uses his powers to burn both Yvette and himself to ash.

Characters in Burnt Offerings

Major characters
Burnt Offerings features the following major characters.
 Anita Blake: Anita becomes even more deeply enmeshed in the supernatural world, as she accepts the role of Nimir-Ra of the St. Louis pard and becomes deeper enmeshed in her roles as Jean-Claude's human servant and the lupa of the Thronos Rokke clan of werewolves.  Meanwhile, her romantic life grows more complicated as she and Richard enchange power and continue to argue over their relationship.  Finally, Anita develops or explores three new powers - her control over the vampires she has raised (Damian and Willie), her ability to cause harm from a distance with a slashing attack similar to some vampires, and her ability to call Raina's munin to heal or harm.
 Jean-Claude: Burnt Offerings continues an ongoing plotline as Jean-Claude struggles to assert control over his newly acquired territory and to assert independence in the larger vampire world.  Meanwhile, Jean-Claude maneuvers Anita into admitting their romantic relationship publicly, and begins a reconciliation with Asher.
 Richard:  Richard continues his downward spiral after Anita's rejection in the previous novel, The Killing Dance.  Anita learns that Richard is unable to accept his werewolf nature, making him vulnerable to challenge and interfering with his ability to lead and protect the pack.  Unable to repair Richard, Anita attempts to contain the damage by preventing anyone from challenging Richard, and by defending the pack herself.

Other characters

Recurring characters in Burnt Offerings include:

 Anita's friends and coworkers Larry and Ronnie.
 Police officers Dolph, Zerbrowski, Clive Perry, and Tammy Reynolds.  Burnt Offerings shows Dolph's mistrust of Anita increasing as she continues to date Jean-Claude, and introduces Tammy, RPIT's first witch officer;
 Werewolves Irving, Jason, Jamil, Stephen, Sylvie and Teddy;
 Wereleopards Cherry, Elizabeth, Nathaniel, Vivian, and Zane;
 Wererats Lillian and Rafael;
 Vampires Asher (Anita Blake: Vampire Hunter), Damian, Liv, and Willie; and
 Jean-Claude's human flunky Ernie.

Non-recurring characters include:

 Gwen:  Sylvie Barker's girlfriend, a psychiatrist and a powerful werewolf, with long wavy blond hair and a dainty, "china doll" appearance.
 Hannah: One of Jean-Claude's vampires. Hannah is also dating Willie McCoy.
 Captain Pete McKinnon:  A fire captain who Dolph refers to Anita for help with a series of pyrokinetic arson crimes.
 Vampire Council members The Traveler and The Master of Beasts.
 Vampire Council retainers Balthasar, Gideon, and Captain Thomas Carswell.
 Non-dominant werewolves Kevin and Lorraine, who Anita forces to protect Stephen and Nathaniel along with non-recurring character Teddy.

The death toll in Burnt Offerings includes: 
 An unnamed assassin from Humans First, shot by Anita and Ronnie;
 Yvette and Warrick, burned to death by Warrick's pyrokinesis;
 Fernando and Liv, presumably tortured to death by Sylvie;
 Harry, a centuries-old vampire with brown hair, owner of "Burnt Offerings," a vampire-themed theme restaurant.  Harry was part of Morte d'Amour's bloodline, and cooperated with Yvette in her scheme to force a vampire-human war.  Presumably, he was killed by Jean-Claude's vampires after the events of the novel.

Major themes

Release details

1998 American novels
American erotic novels
Anita Blake: Vampire Hunter novels
Low fantasy novels
Novels set in St. Louis
Werewolf novels
Ace Books books